Events in the year 1871 in Iceland.

Incumbents 

 Monarch: Christian IX
 Council President of Denmark: Ludvig Holstein-Holsteinborg

Events 

 2 January − Stöðulög (The Laws of Standing) on the constitutional standing of Iceland within the realm) were laws passed by Denmark.

Births 

 Sigríður Tómasdóttir, environmentalist

References 

 
1870s in Iceland
Years of the 19th century in Iceland
Iceland
Iceland